David Ledesma Sacarias (born 8 March 1999) is an Argentine professional footballer who plays as a defender for Quilmes.

Club career
Ledesma's senior career started with Quilmes, having joined the club in 2014 from Deportivo Graneros. He was initially selected as an unused substitute three times throughout the 2017–18 Primera B Nacional campaign, though he was never used by manager Mario Sciacqua in fixtures against Aldosivi, All Boys and Mitre in March/April 2018. His bow in professional football arrived under Leonardo Lemos in the succeeding November versus Gimnasia y Esgrima, with Ledesma featuring for sixty-eight minutes of a goalless draw.

International career
In February 2018, Ledesma was called to train with the Argentina U19s.

Career statistics
.

References

External links

1999 births
Living people
Sportspeople from Tucumán Province
Argentine footballers
Association football defenders
Primera Nacional players
Quilmes Atlético Club footballers